Joseph Scott (6 July 1900 – 1962) was an English professional footballer who played for Cradley Heath, Rotherham County, Barnsley and Tottenham Hotspur.

Scott began his career at Cradley Heath. The outside left joined Rotherham County and featured in 167 matches scoring 54 goals between 1923 and 1927. 
In 1927 he signed for Barnsley and scored three goals in 10 appearances. 

Scott joined Tottenham Hotspur in 1928. He scored on his 'Lilywhites' debut in a 3-2 victory over Wolves at White Hart Lane in September 1928 in the old Second Division. Joe went on to play in a further 18 matches and found the net on four occasions. 

He returned to Cradley Heath where he ended his footballing career.

References 

1900 births
1962 deaths
People from the Metropolitan Borough of Dudley
English footballers
Association football wingers
Cradley Heath F.C. players
Rotherham County F.C. players
Barnsley F.C. players
Tottenham Hotspur F.C. players
English Football League players
Date of death missing
Place of death missing